Gary O'Reilly (born 10 May 1993) is an Irish Para-cyclist who represented Ireland in the 2020 Summer Paralympics. 

https://paralympics.ie/gary-oreilly/

Career
O'Reilly represented Ireland in the men's road time trial H5 event at the 2020 Summer Paralympics and won a bronze medal.

References

1993 births
Living people
People from Portlaoise
Irish male cyclists
Cyclists at the 2020 Summer Paralympics
Medalists at the 2020 Summer Paralympics
Paralympic medalists in cycling
Paralympic bronze medalists for Ireland